Samuel Arnold (born 11 July 1992) is a French actor. He gained popularity for starring in the Netflix TV series Emily in Paris.

Career 
When Arnold was 18, he participated and was a finalist in the French TV show La France a un incroyable talent. From 2012 to 2013, he studied acting at EICAR, The International Film & Television School Paris. Then, he went on to study at the Giles Foreman Centre For Acting from 2013 to 2015.

On 19 January 2022, it was announced that Arnold signed a deal with APA.

Arnold has also appeared in a National Theater Live production of Antony & Cleopatra alongside Ralph Fiennes and Sophie Okonedo, and in the Canal+ comedy series Platane.

He plays the role of Julien in the Netflix TV series Emily in Paris.

He was one of the voices for the French version of Pandemica, an animated content series about a world where the pandemic never ends.

Filmography

References 

1992 births
French actors
French expatriate actors
Living people